Sin Don Chai is the name of two subdistricts in Thailand:

 Si Don Chai, Chiang Khong
 Si Don Chai, Thoeng